"Three Little Kittens" is an English language nursery rhyme, probably  with roots in the British folk tradition. The rhyme as published today however is a sophisticated piece usually attributed to American poet Eliza Lee Cabot Follen (1787–1860). With the passage of time, the poem has been absorbed into the Mother Goose collection. The rhyme tells of three kittens who first lose, then find and soil, their mittens. When all is finally set to rights, the kittens receive their mother's approval and some pie. It has a Roud Folk Song Index number of 16150.

The poem was published in England in 1827 in a mock review by William Ewart Gladstone, writing as Bartholomew Bouverie, in The Eton Miscellany.

A version was later published in 1833 as an anonymous addition to a volume of Follen's verse and in the United States in 1843. Follen may have developed and refined an existing, rude version of the poem, and, in the process, made it her own. The poem is a sophisticated production that avoids the typical moralization of 19th century children's literature in favour of anthropomorphic fantasy, satirical nonsense, and word play.

Text

The cat and her kittens
They put on their mittens, 
To eat a Christmas pie.
The poor little kittens 
They lost their mittens, 
And then they began to cry.

"O mother dear, we sadly fear
We cannot go to-day,
For we have lost our mittens."
"If it be so, ye shall not go,
For ye are naughty kittens."
From Gladstone, The Eton Miscellany (1827)

The three little kittens they lost their mittens,
And they began to cry,
Oh, mother dear, we sadly fear
Our mittens we have lost
What? Lost your mittens, you naughty kittens!
Then you shall have no pie.
Mee-ow, mee-ow, mee-ow.
We shall have no pie.
Our mittens we have lost.

The three little kittens they found their mittens,
And they began to smile,
Oh, mother dear, see here, see here,
Our mittens we have found
What? Found your mittens, you good little kittens,
And you shall have some pie.
Mee-ow, mee-ow, mee-ow.
We shall have some pie.
Let us have some pie.

The three little kittens put on their mittens,
And soon ate up the pie;
Oh, mother dear, we greatly fear
Our mittens we have soiled
What? Soiled your mittens, you naughty kittens!
Then they began to sigh,
Mee-ow, mee-ow, mee-ow.
Our mittens we have soiled.
Then they began to sigh.

The three little kittens they washed their mittens,
And hung them out to dry;
Oh! mother dear, look here, look here,
Our mittens we have washed
What? Washed your mittens, you good little kittens,
But I smell a rat close by.
Mee-ow, mee-ow, mee-ow.
We smell a rat close by.
Let's all have some pie.
From Follen, New Nursery Songs for All Good Children (1843)

Background
According to Janet Sinclair Gray, author of Race and Time, "Three Little Kittens" may have origins in the British folk tradition, but the poem as known today is a sophisticated production far removed from such origins. Gray supports her assertion by pointing out that the cats are not the barnyard felines of folk material but bourgeois domestic cats who eat pie and wear mittens. Gray observes that the mother cat's disciplinary measures and the kittens' need to report their movements to her are also indicators of a bourgeois status. "Three Little Kittens" is attributed to Bostonian Sunday school teacher and abolitionist, Eliza Lee Cabot Follen (1787–1860), a member of a prominent New England family and the author of the juvenile novel The Well-Spent Hour. Gray explains that "Kittens" is unlike any of Follen's typical poems, but also notes that Follen is just the sort of person who would write such a piece. It is unlikely Follen composed "Kittens" wholecloth, Gray believes, but rather far more likely that she developed and refined an existing but rude version of the piece. In doing so, she made the poem her own. Although Follen disclaimed authorship following the poem's first appearance in print, she continued to publish it under her name in succeeding years.

Publication

The poem was printed in 1827 in The Eton Miscellany. A later version was printed in 1833 in Britain in Follen's Little Songs for Little Boys and Girls. It was an addition to the volume and probably inserted by the publisher. In the introduction to a subsequent edition, Follen denied any hand in the poem's composition, but took it under her wing and claimed ownership as the poem passed through various reprints. The poem was first published in the United States in 1843 in Follen's New Nursery Songs for All Good Children. An 1856 American reprint was subtitled "A Cat's Tale, with Additions".

Cuthbert Bede (pen name of Edward Bradley) published a prose version in his Fairy Fables (1857). In 1858 R. M. Ballantyne published his prose version that elaborated Follen's poem 
in a volume of the Good Little Pig's Library. This version included a musical setting for Follen's poem.

Reception
"Three Little Kittens" was hugely popular and quickly absorbed into the Mother Goose collection. Unlike her female literary contemporaries who typically stressed moral edification in their children's pieces, Follen subordinated such edification in "Three Little Kittens" and emphasized fantasy involving anthropomorphic characters, verbal play, and satirical nonsense. The poem is considered a cornerstone in the shift from moral literature for children to romantic literature intended to amuse and entertain.

See also
 The Milky Way (1940 film)
 List of nursery rhymes

Notes

External links

1843 poems
English nursery rhymes
American nursery rhymes
English children's songs
Cats in literature
Fictional cats
Songs about cats
Traditional children's songs